Erythroxylum laurifolium is a species from the genus Erythroxylum. It was first described by Jean-Baptiste de Lamarck.

Range  
The plant is endemic to Reunion and Mauritius.

References

laurifolium